Germán Jesús Osorio Ramírez (born 197?) is a Chilean former professional football forward who played for clubs in Chile, Mexico, and Indonesia.

Career
A product of Universidad de Chile, Osorio made his debut in the 1994 Copa Chile and scored a goal against Unión San Felipe. In the Chilean Primera División, he also played for Deportes La Serena, Deportes Temuco and Coquimbo Unido.

In the Chilean second division, he played for Deportes Concepción, with whom he won the league title in 1994, Deportes Linares and Deportes Melipilla.

Abroad, he had stints with Real Sociedad Zacatecas in Mexico and PSIS Semarang in Indonesia.

Post-retirement
Osorio represented the Chile beach soccer team in the 2009 South American Championship, alongside retired professional footballers such as Rodrigo Cuevas, Rodrigo Sanhueza, Cristian Olivares,  and Carlos Medina, with Miguel Ángel Gamboa as coach.

References

External links
 

Date of birth missing (living people)
Living people
Place of birth missing (living people)
Chilean footballers
Chilean expatriate footballers
Universidad de Chile footballers
Deportes Concepción (Chile) footballers
Deportes La Serena footballers
Real Sociedad de Zacatecas footballers
Deportes Temuco footballers
Deportes Linares footballers
Deportes Melipilla footballers
Coquimbo Unido footballers
PSIS Semarang players
Chilean Primera División players
Primera B de Chile players
Ascenso MX players
Indonesian Premier Division players
Chilean expatriate sportspeople in Mexico
Chilean expatriate sportspeople in Indonesia
Expatriate footballers in Mexico
Expatriate footballers in Indonesia
Association football forwards
Chile international footballers
Chilean football managers